Hickox may refer to:

Hickox
 Anthony Hickox (born 1959), English film director
 April Hickox (born 1955), Canadian artist, photographer, teacher and curator
 Benjamin Hickox (1686–1745), American deacon and politician 
 Charlie Hickcox (1947–2010), American Olympic swimmer
 Dick Hickox (1938–2006), American basketball player
 Douglas Hickox (1929–1988), English film and television director
 Ed Hickox (umpire) (born 1962), American umpire in Major League Baseball
 Edward J. Hickox (1878–1966), American basketball coach and administrator
 Elizabeth Hickox (c. 1872–1947), Wiyot master basket weaver
 Emma E. Hickox (born 1964), British film editor
 Harry Hickox (1910–1994), American character actor
 Jamie Hickox (born 1964), English and Canadian professional squash player
 Laurie Hickox (1945–1961), American pair skater
 Malcolm Hickox (born 1946), sprint canoeist
 Ralph Hickox (1903–1942), American naval officer
 Richard Hickox (1948 –2008), English conductor
 Sidney Hickox (1895–1982), American cinematographer
 William Hickox (1942–1961), American pair skater

Other uses
 Hickox, Georgia, United States, a census-designated place
 USS Hickox (DD-673), an American destroyer

See also
 
 Hickok (disambiguation)
 Hickcox, a surname